Goudsmit is a surname. Notable people with the surname include:

Samuel Goudsmit (1902–1978), Dutch-American physicist
Lex Goudsmit (1913–1999), Dutch actor
Jaap Goudsmit (born 1951), Dutch scientist

See also
9688 Goudsmit, a meteor